The Powder Wash Archaeological District is a grouping of 19 rock art sites in the vicinity of Baggs, Wyoming. It's on the National Register of Historic Places.

References

National Register of Historic Places in Carbon County, Wyoming